The Camden team was a minor league baseball team based in Camden, Delaware. In 1889, the Camden team was a member of the Independent level Delaware State League, finishing in 4th place in a shortened season. The Camden team played without a known moniker, as was common in the era.

History
The Camden team was a charter member when the 1889 Delaware State League began minor league play as an Independent five–team league. The Delaware State League was formed with the Delaware teams of Dover, Milford, Smyrna and Wilmington joining Camden as charter members.

Evolving from local semi–professional baseball, the Delaware State League structure allowed each team to pay eight players and the league had no residency requirements. The league began play with controversy over Dover’s signing of Bill Higgins, who had played in 14 major league games for the Boston Beaneaters the previous season. Smyrna claimed they had also signed Higgins. Dover threatened to fold their franchise over the dispute and review of the situation was resolved in favor of Dover.

The Delaware State League began play on July 8, 1889, as a crowd of 600 was on hand to see Dover defeat Wilmington in the league opener. Camden began play under manager J.R. Richardson.

After beginning play two weeks earlier, the Delaware State League permanently folded on July 25, 1889. The league's demise began when the Smyrna franchise reportedly couldn’t compete with other teams in player salaries and folded, with the team in last place. Within two weeks of Smyrna folding, the entire league folded. Camden had a 3–6 record when the league permanently folded. The league records and standings on the folding date of July 25, 1889 were: Dover (8–2), Milford (6–5), Wilmington (5–4) Camden (3–6) and Smyrna (1–6). Camden was 4.5 games behind Dover in the standings.

Camden, Delaware has not hosted another minor league team.

The ballpark
The name of the 1889 Camden minor league home ballpark is unknown.

Year–by–year record

Notable alumni
Charlie Hilsey (1889)

See also
Camden (minor league baseball) players

References

External links
Baseball Reference

Defunct baseball teams in Delaware
Baseball teams established in 1889
Baseball teams disestablished in 1889
Delaware State League teams
Kent County, Delaware